Zoo Entertainment may refer to:
Zoo Entertainment (record label), a defunct American record label
Zoo Entertainment (video game company), an American video game company